Biggar High School (Local education authority: South Lanarkshire) is a secondary school located in the town of Biggar, South Lanarkshire.

It is a mixed secondary school of non-denominational religion. The current headteacher is Robert Stewart. The school was most recently inspected by Education Scotland in May 2018, and generally performed well. In 2008–2009, a new Biggar High School was erected. Pupils and staff were relocated to the new school building, situated at the former site of the playing fields on Market Road, in August 2009.

A new school building was erected in 2009. There are approximately 724 pupils (age range 11–18) with a teaching staff of around 60.

There are three school houses; Anderson, Burns and Wallace.

In June 2007, Biggar High School won the Most Enterprising School in Scotland award.

Biggar High School won the silver medal at the British Schools Orienteering Championships at Druridge Bay Country Park, Northumberland, England, where three pupils, along with their coach, ran 4 kilometres over sand dunes as high as 25 metres.

References

External links 
 Video by D Chalmers
 Biggar High School's page on ParentZone
 School website

Secondary schools in South Lanarkshire
Biggar, South Lanarkshire